This list comprises all players who signed a Homegrown Player contract with the Houston Dynamo. Stats are for MLS regular season games only.

Players in Bold are still on the roster. As of November 5, 2021

References 

Houston Dynamo Homegrown Players
Houston Dynamo Homegrown Players